Pushkino (formerly, Gerger Russkiy), is a village in the Lori Province of Armenia.

References

Populated places in Lori Province